Seven Hills is a master-planned community located in Henderson, Nevada.

It is home to the Rio Secco Golf Club. Seven Hills is located half of a mile east of the Henderson Executive Airport.

History
A community on the property was initially proposed in the mid-1980s, known as Sky Harbor Ranch, with Japan-based Cosmo World Corporation as the developer. The community's name subsequently changed to Cosmo World, and later to Silver Canyon. The project was cancelled in 1991, when Cosmo World filed for bankruptcy. Forest City Enterprises, in partnership with Canadian developer Terry Johnston, purchased the site in 1993. In January 1996, American Nevada Corporation became a partner in the project, with Forest City remaining as the managing partner and American Nevada becoming the development manager. Development was in progress by April 1996, with site preparations and negotiations with home-builders both underway. Completion of the entire community was expected six to seven years later.

The  parcel southwest of Seven Hills was sold in 2004 for $557 million.  Labeled as 'Inspirada', the area was to be used for "New Urbanism".  A high-density, pedestrian-friendly, master-planned community, it was modeled after towns and neighborhoods built before urban sprawl took root in the United States. Part of the design was to keep Seven Hills and Inspirada as separate areas with no interconnecting roads.

Schools
Elise L. Wolff Elementary School (2001)
Glen C. Taylor Elementary School (2003)
Del E. Webb Middle School (2005)
Henderson International School (2005)
Bob Miller Middle School (1999)
Coronado High School (2001)

Notable people
Bryce Harper
Pierre Omidyar
Mike Tyson

References

Geography of Henderson, Nevada
Planned communities in Clark County, Nevada
Gated communities in Nevada